Occidentarius platypogon, the combinate sea-catfish, is a species of sea catfish found in marine and brackish waters along the Pacific coast from Mexico to Peru. It is the only member of its genus. It is a very abundant fish of the continental shelf and is fished for human consumption. It grows to a length of 45 cm.

References
 

Ariidae
Western Central American coastal fauna
Fish of Colombia
Fish of Ecuador
Taxa named by Albert Günther
Fish described in 1864